Violeta Guzmán Magaña  (born 14 May 1977 in Mexico City) is a Mexican athlete specialising in the hammer throw. She represented her country at the 2004 Summer Olympics failing to qualify for the final.

Her personal best in the event is 64.21 metres from 2004. It is a former national record.

Competition record

References

1977 births
Living people
Mexican female hammer throwers
Athletes from Mexico City
Athletes (track and field) at the 1999 Pan American Games
Athletes (track and field) at the 2003 Pan American Games
Athletes (track and field) at the 2004 Summer Olympics
Olympic athletes of Mexico
Pan American Games competitors for Mexico
Central American and Caribbean Games silver medalists for Mexico
Competitors at the 2002 Central American and Caribbean Games
Central American and Caribbean Games medalists in athletics
Competitors at the 2003 Summer Universiade
20th-century Mexican women
21st-century Mexican women